Bazo may refer to:

 Jeronim Bazo, Albanian military officer
 María Bazo (born 1998), Peruvian windsurfer